Test cricket is the longest form of cricket. The women's variant of the game includes four innings to be completed over four days of play with eleven players in each side. The first women's Test was played between England and Australia in 1934. However, India did not play Test cricket until 1973 when the Women's Cricket Association of India was formed. The Indian women's team played their first Test match in 1976, against the West Indies. The Women's Cricket Association of India was merged with the Board of Control for Cricket in India in 2006 as part of the International Cricket Council's initiative to develop women's cricket.

India have played 37 Tests, starting with their first Test in 1976 and including their most recent one in 2021. They first won a Test in Patna (1976), in front of over 25,000 spectators, against the West Indies but did not win again until 2002, when they won against South Africa. The team has remained unbeaten since 2006, over the course of three Test matches.

Two of India's players, Diana Edulji and Sudha Shah, have featured in more than 20 Test matches. Ten other players have played in ten or more Test matches. Sandhya Agarwal is India's all-time leading run scorer, and is ranked sixth among players from all countries. Among the top ten run scorers of all time, she has the fourth-highest average. Sandhya Agarwal and Mithali Raj, with scores of 190 and 214 respectively, were record holders for the most runs scored in an innings. Former captains Diana Edulji and Shubhangi Kulkarni are third and sixth in terms of most wickets taken in a career while Neetu David has the best bowling figures in an innings, having taken 8 wickets, conceding 53 runs in England's second innings in the hundredth women's Test.

Since the team was formed, 90 women have represented India in Test cricket. This list includes all players who have played at least one Test match and is arranged in the order of debut appearance. Where more than one player won their first Test cap in the same Test match, those players are listed alphabetically by last name at the time of debut.

Key

Test cricketers
Statistics are correct as of 3 October 2021.

Test captains

Notes

References

 
India
Women Test cricketers
Cricketers